The Guayaquila blind snake (Epictia guayaquilensis) is a species of snakes in the family Leptotyphlopidae.

References

Epictia
Snakes of South America
Reptiles of Ecuador
Endemic fauna of Ecuador
Reptiles described in 1970